Miguel Ângelo Moita Garcia (born 4 February 1983) is a Portuguese former professional footballer who played mainly as a right-back.

Club career
Garcia was born in Moura, Alentejo, being a youth product of Sporting CP and making his debut with the first team in 2003–04, in a 2–1 away win against Académica de Coimbra where he played the first half. The following season was remarkable for him: first, against S.L. Benfica in the Taça de Portugal, he missed the penalty that eliminated his team in the round of 16 on 26 January 2005. On 5 May, in the last minute of extra time, he scored a header in the UEFA Cup semi-finals second leg against AZ Alkmaar, as Sporting lost 2–3 away but qualified through the away goals rule.

Garcia signed a pre-contract agreement with Reggina Calcio, joining in summer 2007 after his link with Sporting expired. He suffered a serious knee injury in October, and did not play a single match for the Italian side; on 17 March of the following year, the club communicated the decision to terminate his contract.

In July 2009, after more than two years out of football, Garcia joined Jorge Costa's S.C. Olhanense, recently promoted to the Primeira Liga. However, as João Pereira arrived from S.C. Braga to former side Sporting in late December, he was chosen as his immediate replacement, moving for €50,000 on a one-and-a-half-year contract.

On 1 September 2014, after spells in Turkey and Spain, Garcia joined NorthEast United FC for the inaugural campaign of the Indian Super League. On 15 January of the following year he signed with another club in the nation, I-League's Sporting Clube de Goa, returning to his previous team on 20 June.

After suffering a bilateral achilles tendinopathy injury in the opening game of the 2015 season, against Kerala Blasters FC on 6 October, Garcia was sidelined for several months.

International career
Garcia was a member of the Portugal under-21 side at the 2004 UEFA European Championship, which saw them finish in third place. He failed to gain a place in the squad that competed in Olympic football in Athens the same year, however.

Post-retirement
After retiring, Garcia majored in real estate and opened his own company.

Career statistics

Honours
Sporting CP
Taça de Portugal: 2006–07
UEFA Cup runner-up: 2004–05

Braga
UEFA Europa League runner-up: 2010–11

References

External links

1983 births
Living people
People from Moura, Portugal
Sportspeople from Beja District
Portuguese footballers
Association football defenders
Primeira Liga players
Segunda Divisão players
Sporting CP B players
Sporting CP footballers
S.C. Olhanense players
S.C. Braga players
Reggina 1914 players
Süper Lig players
Orduspor footballers
Segunda División players
RCD Mallorca players
Indian Super League players
I-League players
NorthEast United FC players
Sporting Clube de Goa players
Portugal youth international footballers
Portugal under-21 international footballers
Portugal B international footballers
Portuguese expatriate footballers
Expatriate footballers in Italy
Expatriate footballers in Turkey
Expatriate footballers in Spain
Expatriate footballers in India
Portuguese expatriate sportspeople in Italy
Portuguese expatriate sportspeople in Turkey
Portuguese expatriate sportspeople in Spain
Portuguese expatriate sportspeople in India